The 2005 NACRA Rugby Championship was a rugby union championship for Tier 3 North American and Caribbean teams, and take place between may and October 2005

The tournament was also valid as first round of Americas qualification for 2007 Rugby World Cup

The championship was split between North and South, with the winner of each division playing in a final game.

The tournament was won by Barbados that beat in the finals Bahamas

North Zone 

 Table

South

Preliminary

Pool 

 Table

Final

Related Page 
 NACRA Rugby Championship

External links 
 Details 
 Results

2005
2005 rugby union tournaments for national teams
2005 in North American rugby union
rugby union